Forbush is an unincorporated community in Appanoose County, Iowa, United States.

History
A post office was established in Forbush in 1894, and remained in operation until being discontinued in 1903.

References

Unincorporated communities in Appanoose County, Iowa
1894 establishments in Iowa
Unincorporated communities in Iowa